The 1912 Cork Intermediate Hurling Championship was the fourth staging of the Cork Intermediate Hurling Championship since its establishment by the Cork County Board, which Ballincollig won 5-3 to 5-0 over Redmonds in the final.

Results

Final

References

Cork Intermediate Hurling Championship
Cork Intermediate Hurling Championship